Dane Miller Jr. (born March 10, 1990) is an American basketball player who currently plays for SLAC of the Basketball Africa League (BAL).

College career 
Miller Jr. played for Rutgers in four seasons. He was named to the AAC All-Rookie Team in 2010.

Professional career
Miller was drafted by the Oklahoma City Blue in the 2014 draft of the NBA D-League. On January 9, 2015, Miller officially signed with the Oklahoma City Blue of the NBA D-League.

Miller started playing with SLAC in Guina in 2018. He played with SLAC in the 2018–19 Africa Basketball League, averaging 15.3 points and 7 rebounds for his team.

On January 19, 2019, Miller signed with the Syracuse Stallions to play in The Basketball League (TBL).

On August 15, 2020, Miller signed with Snæfell of the Icelandic Premier League.

He returned to SLAC to play in the 2022 BAL qualification. By averaging 16.8 points and 9.8 rebounds, Miller Jr. helped the team qualify for the 2022 BAL season, the first appearance of the club in the Basketball Africa League.

In the 2022 season, he averaged 14.7 points, 7.2 rebounds and 5.7, helping SLAC reach the quarterfinals.

BAL career statistics

|-
|style="text-align:left;"|2022
|style="text-align:left;"|SLAC
| 6 || 6 || style="background:#cfecec;"| 37.8* || .397 || .158 || .711 || 7.2 || 5.7 || 1.8 || 0.8 || 14.7
|-
| colspan=2 align=center | Career || | 6 || 6 || 37.8 || .397 || .158 || .711 || 7.2 || 5.7 || 1.8 || 0.8 || 14.7

|}

References

External links
RealGM profile
Twitter profile

1990 births
Oklahoma City Blue players
Rutgers Scarlet Knights men's basketball players
SLAC basketball players
Snæfell men's basketball players
Small forwards
Living people

People from Rochester, New York
American men's basketball players